Mount Hirman is a prominent mountain marking the southern end of the Behrendt Mountains, in Ellsworth Land, Antarctica. It was mapped by the United States Geological Survey from surveys and U.S. Navy air photos from 1961 to 1967, and was named by the Advisory Committee on Antarctic Names for Joseph W. Hirman, a scientific leader at Eights Station in 1965.

See also
 Mount Glowa, 8 nautical miles (15 km) west of Mount Hirman
 Mountains in Antarctica

References

External links

Mountains of Ellsworth Land